The 1975–76 NBA season was the Bucks' eighth season in the NBA.

It was the team's first season since its inaugural year without Kareem Abdul-Jabbar, who was traded to the Los Angeles Lakers during the offseason. The Bucks would have a 38–44 record, the worst record in NBA history for a team to win its division.

Draft picks

Roster

Regular season

Season standings

z – clinched division title
y – clinched division title
x – clinched playoff spot

Record vs. opponents

Game log

|-style="background:#fcc;"
| 1 || October 25, 1975 || Chicago
| L 87–91
|Brian Winters (21)
|
|
| MECCA Arena
| 0–1
|-style="background:#fcc;"
| 2 || October 28, 1975 || Los Angeles
| L 92–99
|Dave Meyers (21)
|
|
| MECCA Arena
| 0–2
|-style="background:#fcc;"
| 3 || October 31, 1975 || @ New Orleans
| L 85–100
|Dave Meyers (28)
|
|
| Louisiana Superdome
| 0-3

|-style="background:#fcc;"
| 4 || November 1, 1975 || Portland
| L 97–113
|
|
|
| MECCA Arena
| 0–4
|-style="background:#fcc;"
| 5 || November 2, 1975 || @ Houston
| L 89–104
|
|
|
| The Summit
| 0-5
|-style="background:#bbffbb;"
| 6 || November 4, 1975 || Detroit
| W 103–101
|
|
|
| MECCA Arena
| 1–5
|-style="background:#bbffbb;"
| 7 || November 7, 1975 || Boston
| W 104–101
|
|
|
| MECCA Arena
| 2–5
|-style="background:#bbffbb;"
| 8 || November 8, 1975 || @ Washington
| W 99–95
|Brian Winters (27)
|
|
| Capital Centre
| 3-5
|-style="background:#bbffbb;"
| 9 || November 11, 1975 || Philadelphia
| W 108–81
|
|
|
| MECCA Arena
| 4–5
|-style="background:#bbffbb;"
| 10 || November 12, 1975 || @ Philadelphia
| W 107–84
|
|
|
| The Spectrum
| 5-5
|-style="background:#fcc;"
| 11 || November 14, 1975 || Buffalo
| L 98–112
|
|
|
| MECCA Arena
| 5–6
|-style="background:#fcc;"
| 12 || November 15, 1975 || @ Detroit
| L 89–101
|
|
|
| Cobo Center
| 5-7
|-style="background:#bbffbb;"
| 13 || November 19, 1975 || @ Phoenix
| W 96–94
|
|
|
| Arizona Veterans Memorial Coliseum
| 6-7
|-style="background:#fcc;"
| 14 || November 21, 1975 || @ Los Angeles
| L 104–116
|
|
|
| The Forum
| 6-8
|-style="background:#fcc;"
| 15 || November 23, 1975 || @ Seattle
| L 104–112
|
|
|
| Seattle Center Coliseum
| 6-9
|-style="background:#fcc;"
| 16 || November 27, 1975 || Golden State
| L 105–106
|
|
|
| MECCA Arena
| 6–10
|-style="background:#fcc;"
| 17 || November 28, 1975 || @ Chicago
| L 69–89
|
|
|
| Chicago Stadium
| 6-11
|-style="background:#bbffbb;"
| 18 || November 29, 1975 || Chicago
| W 88–85
|
|
|
| MECCA Arena
| 7–11

|-style="background:#bbffbb;"
| 19 || December 3, 1975 || Portland
| W 114–92
|
|
|
| MECCA Arena
| 8–11
|-style="background:#bbffbb;"
| 20 || December 5, 1975 || Kansas City
| W 105–92
|
|
|
| MECCA Arena
| 9–11

Playoffs

|- align="center" bgcolor="#ccffcc"
| 1
| April 13
| Detroit
| W 110–107
| Gary Brokaw (36)
| Elmore Smith (13)
| Brian Winters (7)
| MECCA Arena8,912
| 1–0
|- align="center" bgcolor="#ffcccc"
| 2
| April 16
| @ Detroit
| L 123–126
| Winters, Dandridge (31)
| Bob Dandridge (9)
| Gary Brokaw (12)
| Cobo Arena8,330
| 1–1
|- align="center" bgcolor="#ffcccc"
| 3
| April 18
| Detroit
| L 104–107
| Brian Winters (33)
| Dave Meyers (10)
| Gary Brokaw (7)
| MECCA Arena8,213
| 1–2
|-

Player statistics

Season

Playoffs

Transactions

Trades

References

Milwaukee Bucks seasons
Milwaukee
Milwau
Milwau